DXRY (104.9 FM), broadcasting as 104.9 Radyo Natin, is a radio station owned and operated by Manila Broadcasting Company. Its studio is located at Purok 2B, Brgy. 1, San Francisco, Agusan del Sur.

References

Radio stations in Agusan del Sur